Admiral Sir James Francis Perowne,  (born 29 July 1947) is a former Royal Navy officer who served as Deputy Supreme Allied Commander Atlantic from 1998 to 2002.

Naval career
Educated at Sherborne School, and the Royal Naval College, Dartmouth, Perowne joined the Royal Navy in 1969. He was given command of the submarine  in 1976, the submarine  in 1981 and the frigate  in 1986. He went on to be Commander of the 2nd Submarine Squadron in 1990, Commanding Officer of the frigate  as well as Captain of the 9th Frigate Squadron in 1992 and Commanding Officer of the frigate HMS Norfolk as well as Captain of the 6th Frigate Squadron in 1993. He then became Senior Naval Member on the Directing Staff at the Royal College of Defence Studies in 1995, Commander Operations and Flag officer Submarines in 1996 and Deputy Supreme Allied Commander Atlantic in 1998. He retired in 2002.

Retirement
In retirement Perowne became Chairman of the Council of the British Red Cross Queen Mother Memorial Fund and Chairman of the Central Region of the Consumer Council for Water.

In 2014 Perowne was appointed Constable and Governor of Windsor Castle. On his relinquishment of this position in 2022, he was appointed a Knight Commander of the Royal Victorian Order (KCVO) on 19 July 2022.

Family
In 1971 Perowne married Susan Anne Holloway; they had four sons. Following the dissolution of his first marriage, he married Caroline Nicola Grimson in 1992.

References

|-

 

1947 births
Knights Commander of the Order of the British Empire
Knights Commander of the Royal Victorian Order
Living people
People educated at Sherborne School
Royal Navy admirals